Funeral Consumers Alliance is a nonprofit federation of organizations ("memorial societies" or "funeral planning societies"), founded in 1963. 

Funeral Consumers Alliance operates in the United States and Canada.

Mission
The alliance's stated goal is that it is "dedicated to protecting a consumer's right to choose a meaningful, dignified, affordable funeral." 

Based in South Burlington, Vermont, its oldest (and founding) member is the Seattle-based People's Memorial Association, founded on January 12, 1939.

References

External links
Official Website
PMA People's Memorial Organization
Funeral Consumers Alliance of Eastern Massachusetts records, 1907-2010

Consumer organizations in the United States
Non-profit organizations based in Vermont
Funeral-related industry